Staromlynivka (until 1946 Staryi Kermenchyk (Старий Керменчик); Urum: Т’ерменчик) is a village in Volnovakha Raion (district) in Donetsk Oblast of eastern Ukraine, at about  southwest by west of the centre of Donetsk city. It belongs to Staromlynivka rural hromada, one of the hromadas of Ukraine.

History

2022 Russian invasion of Ukraine
The village came under attack by Russian forces in 2022, during the Russian invasion of Ukraine.

Demographics
The settlement had 3373 inhabitants in 2001, native language distribution as of the Ukrainian Census of the same year:
Ukrainian: 16.04%
Russian: 82.12%
Greek: 0.8%
Armenian: 0.24%
 Belarusian: 0.15%
Moldovan (Romanian): 0.03%

Gallery

References

External links

 	

Villages in Volnovakha Raion